Joseph P. Dunn, Jr. (November 5, 1909 – July 24, 1984) was an American baseball shortstop and outfielder in the Negro leagues. He played from 1930 to 1940, mostly with the Philadelphia Stars. He served in the United States military during World War II for four years. He also managed the Stars in 1939 and 1940.

References

External links
 and Seamheads

1909 births
1984 deaths
Baltimore Black Sox players
Philadelphia Stars players
Detroit Stars players
Negro league baseball managers
American military personnel of World War II
Baseball players from Oklahoma
People from Oklahoma County, Oklahoma
African Americans in World War II
Baseball shortstops